"Intimacy" is a song recorded by the Australian synthpop band Machinations. It was released in May 1988 as the second single from the band's third studio album, Uptown. The song peaked at number 40 on the Australian ARIA Chart.

Track listing
 7" Single (K 548)
 Side A "Intimacy" 
 Side B "Hit By a Missile"

 12" Single (X 14601)
 Side A1 "Intimacy"   (Extended Mix)  
 Side A2 "Intimacy"   (Dub Mix)  
 Side B1 "Intimacy"   (Instrumental)   
 Side B2 "Hit By a Missile"

Charts

References 

1988 songs
Machinations (band) songs
1988 singles